"Face to Face" is a song recorded by English rock band Siouxsie and the Banshees.  It was composed by the group along with Danny Elfman and was produced by Stephen Hague. The track was featured in the 1992 film Batman Returns and is included on its soundtrack. Film director Tim Burton asked the band to compose the main song of the movie. The track later appeared on the band 1992's compilation album Twice Upon a Time – The Singles and was remastered in 2002 for The Best of Siouxsie and the Banshees. Upon its release in July 1992, the song entered the singles chart in the UK and in Europe.

In the US, tension between people working at the film studio division of Warner Bros. and the executives of Warner Bros. Records label occurred, and the song was ultimately released a few weeks after the film opening date, and only on cassette. Geffen, the band's US record company, didn't get the license to release the song.

Music and background
The song featured strings which build to a dramatic conclusion. Lyrically, the song makes indirect references to the film's characters Bruce Wayne/Batman played by Michael Keaton, and Selina Kyle/Catwoman played by Michelle Pfeiffer. "Face to Face" was heard in the film during a ballroom scene in which the characters dance together, not realising that, as their alter-egos (Batman and Catwoman), they are enemies. The lyrics reflected the characters' conflict ("...Cheek to cheek / the bitter sweet / commit your crime / in your deadly time / It's too divine / I want to bend / I want this bliss / but something says I must resist..."). At one point, Siouxsie can be heard purring like a cat, a reference to Catwoman. Tim Burton requested the Banshees to write the song of the film: "I've always been a fan – Siouxsie is one of very few women who can create a realistic primal cat sound".

The recording sessions took place at Real World studios in Bath, South West of England. The strings were then recorded in Los Angeles with Danny Elfman, who composed and supervised the Batman Returns score. In the film, the song can be heard in one scene and during the end credits.

Release
In the US, the song was first included on the Batman Returns movie soundtrack album which was released by Warner Bros. on 23 June 1992. Due to contractual problems, the song was then released on its own a couple of weeks later in the US, but only on cassette, by Warner Bros., which had owned the copyright for the Batman Returns soundtrack. Consequently, Geffen, the band's US record company, didn't have the license and was not allowed to release the song on any other format. Outside the US, Polydor found an agreement with Warner Bros. to release the song as a single, on vinyl, 7-inch and 12-inch, and on cassette and CD. 808 State remixed the song, issued as "Face to Face (Catatonic Mix)".

"Face to Face" peaked at No. 21 in the UK Singles Chart. It also performed well on American alternative rock radios, where the single peaked at No. 7 on the U.S. Billboard Modern Rock Tracks chart.

Critical reception
At the time of its release as a single, the Stud Brothers wrote in Melody Maker: "It's a slow, heavily orchestral & sensuously tense piece with Siouxsie first tapt, then cracked and finally spiralling off into the ether".

Promotional video
Two versions of the music video picturing Siouxsie surrounded with cats were made: the video broadcast on music channels included shots from the movie with Michelle Pfeiffer as Catwoman. Burton initially wanted to direct the video but had to cancel after Warner Bros. asked for a new sequence to change the end of the movie. Burton's assistant Neil Abramson stepped in and "followed Burton's plan to match the video to the film".

Track listingUK 7" single "Face to Face"
 "I Could Be Again"

 also released on cassetteUK 12" picture disc single "Face to Face (Catatonic Mix)" *
 "Face to Face"
 "Hothead"UK CD single' (Available as a limited edition foldout digipak)
 "Face to Face"
 "I Could Be Again"
 "Hothead"
 "Face to Face (Catatonic Mix)" *

(* Mixed by 808 State)

Charts

References 

1992 singles
Siouxsie and the Banshees songs
Batman (1989 film series)
Batman music
Song recordings produced by Stephen Hague
Songs written by Danny Elfman
1992 songs
Warner Records singles